Mount Joy Township is a township in northwestern Lancaster County, Pennsylvania, United States. The population was 10,753 at the 2020 census.

Geography
The borough of Elizabethtown borders the township to the southwest, and the borough of Mount Joy borders the southern end of the township. Unincorporated communities in the township include Bellaire, Aberdeen, Milton Grove, Anchor, and part of Rheems.

Demographics

As of the census of 2010, there were 9,873 people, 3,621 households, and 2,810 families living in the township.  The population density was 354.6 people per square mile.  There were 3,768 housing units.  The racial makeup of the township was 95.3% White, 1.1% African American, 0.1% Native American, 1.0% Asian, 1.0% from other races, and 1.5% from two or more races. Hispanic or Latino of any race were 2.9% of the population.

There were 3,621 households, out of which 35.0% had children under the age of 18 living with them, 65.5% were married couples living together, 8.4% had a female householder with no husband present, and 22.4% were non-families. 17.4% of all households were made up of individuals, and 5.4% had someone living alone who was 65 years of age or older.  The average household size was 2.73 and the average family size was 3.07.

In the township the population was spread out, with 26.0% under the age of 18 and 11.4% who were 65 years of age or older.  The median age was 37.4 years.

Government and infrastructure
The Pennsylvania Department of Corrections Training Academy is located in the township.

Education 
The township is served by the Elizabethtown Area School District and Donegal School District.

References

External links

 Mount Joy Township

Populated places established in 1735
Townships in Lancaster County, Pennsylvania
Townships in Pennsylvania